Pyrethrin I is one of the two pyrethrins, natural organic compounds with potent insecticidal activity. It is an ester of (+)-trans-chrysanthemic acid with (S)-(Z)-pyrethrolone.

Total synthesis
The synthesis of pyrethrin I involves the esterification of (+)-trans-chrysanthemic acid with (S)-(Z)-pyrethrolone. One synthetic method for each of these is shown in the images below. Sobti and Dev of the Malti-Chem Research Centre in Nadesari, vadodara, India published this method for chrysanthemic acid in 1974. The starting material for the synthesis uses commercially available (+)-3α, 4α-epoxycarane (1). A lactone is eventually formed and the ring is opened by the use of a Grignard reagent to give (+)-trans-chrysanthemic acid.  The preparation of (S)-pyrethrolone is essentially a 2 step synthesis. The starting material (S)-4-hydroxy-3-methyl-2-(2-propynyl)-2-cyclopenten-1-one (7) is also commercially available as the alcohol moiety of ETOC. Tetrakis(triphenylphosphine)palladium(0), copper(I) iodide, triethylamine, and vinyl bromide are added to (7) to add two more carbons and form (8). The final step is the addition of an activated zinc compound to reduce the triple carbon bond to form the cis product, (S)-pyrethrolone (9).  Although no journal articles specify the combining of the alcohol and acid moieties of pyrethrin I, they could be combined through an esterification process to form the wanted product.

Synthesis of the acid moiety

Synthesis of the alcohol moiety

References

Allethrins
Total synthesis